Terebra reticularis is a species of sea snail, a marine gastropod mollusc in the family Terebridae, the auger snails.

Description
The length of the shell attains 20.2 mm.

Distribution
This marine species occurs off Mauritania and the Congo.

References

 Rolán E., 2005. Malacological Fauna From The Cape Verde Archipelago. Part 1, Polyplacophora and Gastropoda
 Terryn Y. & Ryall P. (2014) West African Terebridae, with the description of a new species from the Cape Verde Islands. Conchylia 44(3–4): 27–47
 Bratcher T. & Cernohorsky W.O. (1987). Living terebras of the world. A monograph of the recent Terebridae of the world. American Malacologists, Melbourne, Florida & Burlington, Massachusetts. 240pp

External links
 Sacco F. (1891). I Molluschi dei Terreni Terziarii del Piemonte e della Liguria. Parte X. (Cassididae (aggiunte), Terebridae e Pusionellidae). Carlo Clausen, Torino, 68 pp., 2 pls
 Talavera, F. G. (1975). Moluscos de sedimentos de la plataforma continental de Mauritania. Boletín del Instituto Español de Oceanografía. 192: 1-14, 4 pls
 Sacco F. (1891). I Molluschi dei Terreni Terziarii del Piemonte e della Liguria. Parte X. (Cassididae (aggiunte), Terebridae e Pusionellidae). Carlo Clausen, Torino, 68 pp., 2 pls
  Fedosov, A. E.; Malcolm, G.; Terryn, Y.; Gorson, J.; Modica, M. V.; Holford, M.; Puillandre, N. (2020). Phylogenetic classification of the family Terebridae (Neogastropoda: Conoidea). Journal of Molluscan Studies. 85(4): 359-388

Terebridae
Gastropods described in 1891